Jane Bell  (born 1873 – died 1959) was an Scotland-born Australian nurse and midwife. She is best known for her work with  Australian Imperial Force (AIF) field hospitals in Egypt in World War I, and for her advocacy for the nursing profession.

Bell was born on 16 March 1873 in Middlebie. After the death of both her parents from tuberculosis, Bell migrated to Sydney with her siblings, assisted by her family's Presbyterian parish. Bell trained as nurse at Royal Prince Alfred Hospital in Sydney. She moved to London in 1906, where she trained in midwifery at the then-named Queen Charlotte's Hospital.

Bell was the matron of the Melbourne Hospital from 1910 to 1934. She was awarded the Officer of the Order of the British Empire in the 1944 New Year Honours in recognition of her work as president of the Royal Victoria College of Nursing.

Bell died on  6 August 1959 at the Royal Melbourne Hospital in Parkville, Victoria.

"Jane Bell Lane" located in the Queen Victoria Village retail precinct in Melbourne is named in her honour.

References

1873 births
1959 deaths
Australian Officers of the Order of the British Empire
Scottish emigrants to Australia
Australian nurses